The Real Democratic Party (Hanja: 正統民主黨, RR: Jeongtong Minjudang) was a minor left-leaning political party in South Korea. It was established on 12 March 2012 by members of the larger Democratic United Party who had failed to win nominations for candidature in the 2012 legislative elections.

Election results

References

Democratic parties in South Korea
Political parties established in 2012
2012 establishments in South Korea
Political parties disestablished in 2012
2012 disestablishments in South Korea